Sarah Jane Spidy Murphy (born February 16, 1988 in Banff, Alberta) is a New Zealand biathlete. She represented New Zealand at the 2010 Winter Olympics. She was the first Kiwi Olympic biathlete.

Born in Canada to a New Zealand mother and a Canadian father, she was raised in Canmore, Alberta, and Nelson, New Zealand.

At the 2010 Winter Olympics in Vancouver, Murphy finished 82nd in both the 7.5 km and 15 km events and did not compete in the 10 km pursuit.

Her best performance to date has been to finish 45th in a field of 96 at a World Cup event in Germany in January 2010.

Cross-country skiing results
All results are sourced from the International Ski Federation (FIS).

World Championships

World Cup

Season standings

References

External links
Vancouver2010
Her official website

1988 births
Living people
Canadian female biathletes
New Zealand female biathletes
Canadian female cross-country skiers
New Zealand people of Canadian descent
Sportspeople from Alberta
Olympic biathletes of New Zealand
Biathletes at the 2010 Winter Olympics